Hex Heroes is an unreleased party, real-time strategy game for Microsoft Windows, macOS, Linux and supposedly Wii U (although the Wii U eShop will be closing March 2023). The game is being developed by Prismatic Games, and designed by Mario Castañeda, who had previously co-created The Bridge.

Gameplay
Up to five players, one with the Wii U GamePad and four with Wii Remotes, harvest resources, build structures, fend off enemies, and explore dangerous territories. The player using the GamePad manages resources and teammates, makes executive decisions, and surveys the land from a bird's-eye view. There are different classes to choose from with each playing a different role.

Characters
The game features a number of characters from various franchises. Each character serves as a swap for each in-game class but has their own unique animations and personalities.

Development
The idea came out from a game jam. The developers had reached out to Nintendo through its indie self-publishing program. A project was created on Kickstarter to help raise $80,000 to develop the game. The developers had got in touch with Grant Kirkhope and after a couple of months brought him on board.  Cameo characters, which the developers wanted to include but were unable to, were Beck, Shantae, Raz, and Steve.

On April 24, 2014, the game was successfully funded, having reached $86,000, though it hadn't reached any of its stretch goals.

In December 2015, Hex Heroes was displayed at the 2015 GX3 convention, and was well-received, landing Prismatic an investor. In March 2016, the game was displayed at the 2016 GDC Play conference, and was named as an honorable mention for the Best in Play award.

As of January 6, 2018, Prismatic announced via Kickstarter that Nintendo denied access to their development kit to the Switch. On February 16, 2022, Nintendo announced the closure of the 3DS and Wii U eShop effective March 2023. The game is currently incomplete and there is no indication that it will be completed.

Marketing
To help promote the game, the game's designer Mario Castañeda narrated an episode of Did You Know Gaming? covering the Super Nintendo Entertainment System.

References

External links

Hex Heroes on Kickstarter

Crossover video games
Game jam video games
Kickstarter-funded video games
Linux games
Multiplayer and single-player video games
MacOS games
Vaporware video games
Video games scored by Grant Kirkhope
Video games developed in the United States
Wii U eShop games
Windows games